Bhaironji is a Hindu god of the underworld in Rajasthan, India. Some scholars note that he is viewed as form of Shiva in Rajasthan.

Jeffrey G. Snodgrass (professor of anthropology at the Colorado State University) notes that Bhaironji is seen as "a pan–Indian boss of the underworld".

Bhaironji and Balaji
Bhaironji, along with Pretraj, is believed to be an assistant deity of Balaji. They are viewed as the foremost prosecutors of Balaji and believed to provide legal assistance to him during the trials of the Bhuts who have possessed people, at Balaji's temple in Rajasthan.

Rituals by devotess
Snodgrass states that upon the birth of a male child, the Bhats in India offer "gifts" to Bhaironji, especially a ritual sacrifice of goat. He relates this practice to Sanskritisation and observes,

Possession
According to Snodgrass, Bhaironji is believed to sometimes possess people.

References

Religion in Rajasthan
Regional Hindu gods
Underworld gods